Ancient Faith Radio (AFR) is an Orthodox Christian Internet radio station, a division of Ancient Faith Ministries (AFM), a department of the Antiochian Orthodox Christian Archdiocese of North America. In addition to its two streaming stations, Ancient Faith Music and Ancient Faith Talk, as well as live church service streaming and call-in shows, AFR features more than one hundred podcasts hosted by a variety of contributors, including both clergy and laity of the Orthodox Church.

Although AFM is a part of the Antiochian Archdiocese, like all of its ministries, AFR is specifically designed to be "pan-Orthodox," with both content creators and listeners from a variety of Orthodox traditions. While most of its audience is Orthodox, AFR also has a significant listener base among Christians of other traditions.

AFR features some of the more prominent figures in English-language Orthodox Christian media, including Kh. Frederica Mathewes-Green, the late Fr. Thomas Hopko, Fr. Patrick Henry Reardon, Fr. Andrew Stephen Damick, Dr. Jeannie Constantinou, Fr. John Oliver, and Elissa Bjeletich.

Overview
In , John Maddex founded Ancient Faith Radio after a career as the division manager of Moody Institute's 35 radio stations and radio work for Focus on the Family.

Originally AFR primarily featured Orthodox worship music, interspersed with quotes from the Bible and the Church Fathers as well as a "Saint of the Day" segment. Later, podcasts were added with teaching-oriented broadcasts from such figures as Fr. Thomas Hopko and Fr. Patrick Henry Reardon.

In , Ancient Faith Radio received 135,000 iPod downloads a month.

See also 
 History of the Orthodox Church in North America
 Orthodox Christian worship

References

External links
 

2004 establishments in Indiana
Antiochian Orthodox Church in the United States
Christian radio stations in North America
Companies based in Chesterton, Indiana
Eastern Orthodoxy in Indiana